Nucleocosmochronology or nuclear cosmochronology is a technique used to determine timescales for astrophysical objects and events. It compares the observed ratios of abundances of heavy radioactive and stable nuclides to the primordial ratios predicted by nucleosynthesis theory in order to calculate the age of formation of astronomical objects.

Nucleocosmochronology has been employed to determine the age of the Sun ( billion years) and of the Galactic thin disk ( billion years), among others.  It has also been used to estimate the age of the Milky Way itself, as exemplified by a recent study of Cayrel's Star in the Galactic halo, which due to its low metallicity, is believed to have formed early in the history of the Galaxy.  Limiting factors in its precision are the quality of observations of faint stars and the uncertainty of the primordial abundances of r-process elements.

See also 
 Astrochemistry
 Geochronology
 Gyrochronology

References 

Dating methods
Astrophysics
Nuclear physics